Abiram Chamberlain (December 7, 1837 – May 15, 1911) was an American politician, and the 60th governor of Connecticut from 1903 to 1905.

Biography
Chamberlain was born in Colebrook, Connecticut on December 7, 1837, son of Abiram Chamberlain and Sophronia Ruth (Burt) Chamberlain.  He was a student of civil engineering at the Williston Seminary, in Easthampton, Massachusetts. He was married on November 21, 1872, to Charlotte E. Roberts  and they had two children. Chamberlain worked at father's engineering firm for many years.

Career
Chamberlain entered into banking and at the age of thirty, in 1867, he was elected Cashier of the Home National Bank of Meriden and moved to that city. In 1881 he was elected president of that bank and served as president of the New Britain National Bank in 1881. He also served as vice president of the Meriden Savings Bank.

Entering into politics in the 1870s, as a member of the Meriden city council, Chamberlain also served as a member of the Connecticut House of Representatives from 1877 to 1878, and was Connecticut's state comptroller from 1901 to 1902.

Chamberlain won the 1902 Republican gubernatorial nomination, and was elected Connecticut's 43rd governor. During his tenure, he signed legislation that sanctioned the establishment of the Connecticut State Police, and he endorsed laws that assisted workers.

On February 1, 1903, he became the first Connecticut governor to deploy the National Guard against strikers, as part his response to the Waterbury Trolley Strike of 1903. His response to station 17 infantry companies and two Gatling gun sections for four days in the city was criticized by Waterbury Mayor Edward G. Kilduff. Regarding the criticism, Chamberlain told the Hartford Courant that "The mayor thought we had sent more troops than necessary but I told him I didn't think so. When it came up to the state to act I proposed to do so in a way that would have a strong moral effect. While we didn't send the troops there to kill anyone it would have been useless to send a company or two there." On January 4, 1905, Chamberlain left office and retired from public service. He returned to his various business interests in Meriden.

Death
Chamberlain died on May 15, 1911. He is interred at Walnut Grove Cemetery, Meriden, New Haven County, Connecticut.

References

External links
 Sobel, Robert and John Raimo. Biographical Directory of the Governors of the United States, 1789-1978. Greenwood Press, 1988. 
National Governors Association
 The governors of Connecticut: biographies of the chief executives

The Political Graveyard

1837 births
1911 deaths
Connecticut city council members
Republican Party members of the Connecticut House of Representatives
Connecticut Comptrollers
Republican Party governors of Connecticut
People from Colebrook, Connecticut
19th-century American politicians